& Juliet is a 2019 coming-of-age jukebox musical featuring the music of Swedish pop songwriter Max Martin, with a book by David West Read. The story focuses on a "what if" scenario, where Juliet does not die at the end of Shakespeare's Romeo and Juliet.

& Juliet premiered at the Manchester Opera House in September 2019, before transferring to the  West End in November 2019. At the 2020 Laurence Olivier Awards, & Juliet received 9 nominations and won 3 awards, including  Best Actress in a Musical for Miriam-Teak Lee in the title role. The West End production was also received a record-breaking 13 nominations at the 2020 WhatsOnStage Awards, ultimately winning 6 awards.

Synopsis

Act One
Shakespeare is introduced by the cast at his first production of Romeo and Juliet, who then welcomes the audience to his newest play ("Larger than Life"). Shakespeare then also introduces his wife, Anne Hathaway, who is visiting from Stratford-Upon-Avon to see the play. She suggests he change the ending, wondering what would have happened if Juliet did not kill herself, much to Shakespeare' displeasure ("I Want It That Way"). Nevertheless, Shakespeare allows his wife to explain her idea for the play, which begins with Juliet waking up to find Romeo dead ("...Baby One More Time").

At Romeo's funeral, Juliet finds out that Romeo had many other relationships, with both men and women ("Show Me the Meaning of Being Lonely") and, upon learning of their forbidden relationship, Juliet's parents decide they will send her to a convent. May, Juliet's non-binary friend, and Angelique, her nurse, come to her rescue, while Anne writes herself into the play as 'April', another of Juliet's friends. The four of them decide to take a road trip to Paris ("Domino"). Anne writes Shakespeare into her story as a carriage driver, as the trip to Paris begins ("Show Me Love").

Once in France, they attend a ball which is intended as a party for Francois. His father, Lance, tells him he must either marry or join the army, even though Francois does not wish to pursue either option. Meanwhile, Juliet, Angelique, May, and April sneak into the party ("Blow"). Francois notices their arrival, but does not mind that they crashed his party. May reveals to Juliet that they suffer from  gendered concepts such as gender-specific bathrooms and gendered languages, like the French language ("I'm Not a Girl, Not Yet a Woman"). Francois and Juliet begin to bond about their stifled lives and shared experiences ("Overprotected"). Francois finds himself attracted to Juliet, and they dance together ("Confident").

Angelique and Lance spend the night together, and it is revealed they she was formerly the nurse to his children. Lance asks her to stay, while Angelique wants to continue to look after Juliet ("Teenage Dream/Break Free"). Juliet wakes up next to Francois, who proposes, causing Juliet to agonise about her previous relationship with Romeo ("Oops!... I Did It Again"). When her parents arrive to take her to the convent, she quickly accepts Francois' proposal, before discovering Angelique and Lance's previous relationship. Anne challenges Shakespeare for making Juliet get married again, and complains that he never writes about happy marriages. 

Deciding that he needs to introduce a conflict or a plot twist to Anne's version of the play, Shakespeare has Francois and May meet again. After the two share a sudden kiss, they both feel conflicted ("I Kissed a Girl"). Making things even more complicated, Shakespeare intends to bring Romeo back from the dead, despite Anne's protests. Romeo arrives and declares his return, saying that he has come back for his wife ("It's My Life").

Act Two
Romeo finds Juliet, forgives her for not killing herself, and wants to go back to being married to her ("Love Me Like You Do"). Juliet reveals to Romeo her engagement with Francois ("Since You've Been Gone"). Shakespeare is frustrated with Anne that Juliet did not listen to Romeo's side of events. Anne counters that this is important to her and that she feels Shakespeare cares more about his plays than his family. Angered, Anne breaks Shakespeare's quill, meaning that neither of them can make any further changes to the story.

May grows angry at Francois for ignoring his feelings for them and for still planning on marrying Juliet ("Whataya Want From Me"), while Juliet complains to May that Romeo lied to her. Francois grows worried, as he hasn't told Juliet about his feelings for May.

Romeo and Juliet meet up again, where Romeo reflects that he only ever felt valued for his looks and that Juliet made him want to be a better person ("One More Try"). Despite their recent bonding, Juliet remains unsure of her feelings towards Romeo ("Problem/Can't Feel My Face"). Francois' brother (in fact Shakespeare in disguise) invites Romeo to join the family band, who will play at Juliet and Francois' wedding. Angelique, in the meantime, proposes to Lance.

Anne discovers that Juliet is still in love with Romeo and recounts her own romance with Shakespeare ("That's the Way It Is"). At the wedding, Shakespeare, May, Francois, Lance and Romeo perform ("Everybody"). Francois begins to read his vows to Juliet ("As Long as You Love Me"). However, both Juliet and Francois change their minds about getting married, with Francois confessing his feelings for May ("It's Gonna Be Me"). This prompts Romeo to again confess his love to Juliet while her parents insist she returns to Verona with them, stating that they know what's best for her, which Juliet refutes ("Stronger").

Lance apologizes to Francois and accepts his and May's relationship ("Shape of My Heart"). Angelique reassures Juliet that she will never leave her ("Fuckin' Perfect"), but Juliet insists Angelique goes with Lance, before deciding to be confident and take charge of her own destiny ("Roar"). 

Shakespeare complains that Anne ruined his play, and that he only brought back Romeo to give Juliet the happy ending he thought Anne wanted. Anne refutes this, saying she wants Juliet to be able to make her own choices. Realizing he has hurt Anne, Shakespeare apologizes ("I Want It That Way – Reprise"). 

Shakespeare and Anne agree there does not need to be a conclusive ending, rather a new beginning. Romeo apologizes to Juliet and they decide to go on a first date, Angelique and Lance get married, and Francois and May begin a relationship. 

Because he wants everyone to go home happy, Shakespeare and the company perform ("Can't Stop the Feeling!").

Cast and characters

Notable West End cast replacements
Angelique/Nurse: Keala Settle

Musical numbers 
& Juliet is a jukebox musical and featured existing music co-written by Max Martin, except for the new original song "One More Try", co-written by Jessie J.

Productions

Manchester 
& Juliet premiered at the Manchester Opera House, running from 10 September to 12 October 2019. The cast starred Miriam-Teak Lee as Juliet. The rest of the cast included Oliver Tompsett as Shakespeare, Cassidy Janson as Anne/April, Melanie La Barrie as Angelique the Nurse, David Bedella as Lance, Jordan Luke Gage as Romeo, Arun Blair-Mangat as May and Tim Mahendran as Francois.

West End 

The show premiered in the West End at the Shaftesbury Theatre on 2 November 2019, in previews, ahead of an official opening on 20 November 2019. All of the cast from the Manchester run of the show transferred for the West End engagement, directed by Luke Sheppard.

In 2020, the show was nominated for 9  Olivier Awards, winning 3 awards. Miriam-Teak Lee won  Best Actress in a Musical for her role as Juliet, Cassidy Janson won  Best Actress in a Supporting Role for her role as Anne / April, and David Bedella won  Best Actor in a Supporting Role for his role as Lance.

On 16 March 2020, the show suspended production due to the COVID-19 pandemic. & Juliet resumed performances on 24 September 2021. All of the main cast returned to the show, with the exception of Blair-Mangat, whose role as May was taken over by Alex Thomas-Smith.

On 26 March 2022, La Barrie, Bedella, and Gage departed & Juliet. The role of Nurse/Angelique was played by Keala Settle, in her West End debut, from 29 March until 18 June 2022. In February 2022, it was announced that Julius D'Silva was cast as Lance and Tom Francis were cast as Romeo.

The West End production will close on 25 March 2023.

Toronto 
& Juliet had a pre-Broadway engagement at the Princess of Wales Theatre in Toronto, Canada. The North American premiere was originally scheduled to open in February 2021, but was postponed as a result of the COVID-19 pandemic. It opened on 22 June 2022, and ran through 14 August 2022.

On 6 May 2022, the cast was announced. It starred Lorna Courtney as Juliet, with Stark Sands as Shakespeare, Betsy Wolfe as Anne/April, Melanie La Barrie reprising her role as Angelique the Nurse, Paulo Szot as Lance, Ben Jackson Walker as Romeo, Justin David Sullivan as May, and Philippe Arroyo as Francois.

Broadway 

In August 2021, it was announced that & Juliet will transfer to Broadway following a pre-Broadway engagement in Toronto. All of the cast from the pre-Broadway engagement transferred to Broadway production. & Juliet opened on Broadway at the Stephen Sondheim Theatre, with previews on 28 October 2022 ahead of an official opening on 17 November 2022.

Melbourne 
In May 2022, it was announced that & Juliet will make its Australian premiere at the  Regent Theatre in February 2023.

On 29 November 2022, the Australian cast was announced. It will star Lorinda May Merrypor as Juliet, with Rob Mills as Shakespeare, Amy Lehpamer as Anne/April,  Casey Donovan as Angelique the Nurse, Hayden Tee as Lance, Blake Appelqvist as Romeo, Jesse Dutlow as May, and Yashith Fernando as Francois.

Awards

Original West End production

See also
 Once Upon a One More Time - a similar jukebox musical that modernizes fairy tales to the songs of Britney Spears

References

External links 

2019 musicals
West End musicals
Jukebox musicals
Plays and musicals based on Romeo and Juliet
Cultural depictions of William Shakespeare
LGBT-related musicals